X Ray: The Inner Image is an Indian psychological thriller film. It stars Rahul Sharma and Yaashi Kapoor in the lead and is directed by Rajiv S Ruia.

Synopsis
X Ray: The Inner Image is the story of a young boy, Vishal, who faces emotional changes and dilemmas. He encounters a girl named Yashi, whose car breaks down near his bungalow and offers her a place to stay. Vishal gets awestruck with Yashi`s beauty and starts expressing his love for her but Yashi remains unfazed. The situation gets out of hand when Vishal aggressively approaches her. Does she manage to escape or does Vishal succeed?

Cast 

 Raahul Sharma
 Yaashi Kapoor
 Evelyn Sharma For A Song

Soundtrack 

The music for the film was composed by Raaj Aashoo and the lyrics written by Shabbir Ahmed & Alka Khan.

References 

2019 films
Indian thriller drama films
Indian psychological thriller films
Indian psychological drama films
Indian slasher films
2010s psychological drama films
2019 psychological thriller films
2010s slasher films
2019 thriller drama films